Turbonilla unifasciata is a species of sea snail, a marine gastropod mollusk in the family Pyramidellidae, the pyrams and their allies.

References

External links
 To World Register of Marine Species
 Carpenter, P. P. (1857). Catalogue of the collection of Mazatlan Mollusca in the British Museum collected by Frederick Reigen. London: British Museum. xvi + 552 pp

unifasciata
Gastropods described in 1857